Xiong Yong (died 838 BC) was from 847 to 838 BC the 10th viscount of the state of Chu during the Western Zhou Dynasty of ancient China.  Like other early Chu rulers, he held the hereditary noble rank of viscount first granted to his ancestor Xiong Yi by King Cheng of Zhou.

Xiong Yong succeeded his father, the elder Xiong Yan, who died in 848 BC.  He died after 10 years of reign and was succeeded by his younger brother, the younger Xiong Yan.

References

Monarchs of Chu (state)
9th-century BC Chinese monarchs
838 BC deaths
Year of birth unknown